Bonefro is a comune (municipality) in the Province of Campobasso in the Italian region Molise, located about  northeast of Campobasso.

Bonefro borders the following municipalities: Casacalenda, Montelongo, Montorio nei Frentani, Ripabottoni, San Giuliano di Puglia, Sant'Elia a Pianisi, Santa Croce di Magliano.

Main sights

Lombard Castle, built around the middle of the tenth century AD 
Santa Maria delle Rose, in Romanesque style (12th-13th century) 
Porta Molino, Porta Pie la Terra, Fountain Gate and Porta Nuova, gates dating back to the Lombard period. 
Convent of Santa Maria delle Grazie (1716)

Culture
Bonefro hosts the annual  Adriatic Chamber Music Festival   (Festival di Adriatico da Musica da Camera) in July.

References

External links
 Official website
 Adriatic Chamber Music Festival website

Cities and towns in Molise